Agnes Mary Christabel Latham (31 January 1905 – 13 January 1996) was a British academic, Professor of English at Bedford College. She is remembered for her lifelong project of editing the letters of Sir Walter Raleigh  and for her edition of As You Like It for the Arden Shakespeare.

Early life
Latham was the middle of three daughters of Harry Latham and Francis Marian Latham. She studied at Wakefield Girls' High School, and later received a scholarship to Somerville College, Oxford. There, she graduated with a first class English Literature and Language degree.

Career
In 1929 she published her edition of the poems of Sir Walter Raleigh. Her research was completed within a year, funded by a grant from Wakefield Girls' High School.

After a period of school teaching, she obtained a post of lecturing in English at Bedford College, London in 1940 but was suspended until 1946 because of the outbreak of World War II. She remained at Bedford college until 1958. At Bedford, her lectures focused on English language and syntax.

Her project of editing Sir Walter Raleigh's letters gained her international recognition. Their publication is currently being completed at Exeter University. Between then and her retirement in 1973, she gained a readership and engaged in teachings of Shakespeare and Milton in 1958. During this time she was frequently reviewing anonymously for The Times Literary Supplement.

Latham is perhaps best known for her edition of As You Like It for the Arden Shakespeare which was published subsequent to her retirement in 1975. It was considered "impressive not only for its weight of scholarly insight but also for its careful consideration of the readers needed to be persuaded to share her prestigious knowledge of the Renaissance period and its values the better to appreciate the power of the text as drama".

Publications

Shakespeare, William, ed. Angles Latham, As you like it: The Arden Shakespeare. Methuem publishing, 22 May 1975
Latham, Agnes M. C. Sir Walter Ralegh. London: Longmans, Green, 1964
Raleigh, Walter, and Agnes Mary Christabel. LATHAM. The Poems of Sir Walter Ralegh. Edited with an introduction by Agnes M.C. Latham. Pp. lxiii. 182. *Routledge & Kegan Paul: London, 1951
Ralegh, Walter, and Agnes M. C. Latham. Selected Prose and Poetry. University of London: Athlone Press, 1965
Raleigh, Walter, Agnes M. C. Latham, and Joyce A. Youings. The letters of Sir Walter Ralegh. Exeter: U of Exeter Press, 1999
Raleigh, Walter ed. Latham, Agnes. The poems. Constable, London 1929

References

Census Returns of England and Wales, 1911. Kew, Surrey, England: The National Archives of the UK (TNA), 1911.

1905 births
1996 deaths
British women academics
Academics of Bedford College, London
British writers
British women writers
Alumni of Somerville College, Oxford